The Sawtooth Range is a small mountain range in southeastern Alaska, United States, located just southwest of Warm Pass and on the north side of the East Fork of the Skagway River. It has an area of 97 km2 and is a subrange of the Boundary Ranges which in turn form part of the Coast Mountains.

See also
List of mountain ranges

References

Boundary Ranges
Landforms of the Municipality of Skagway Borough, Alaska